Fury of the Congo (1951) is the sixth Jungle Jim film produced by Columbia Pictures. It features Johnny Weissmuller in his sixth performance as the protagonist adventurer Jungle Jim. The film was directed by William Berke and written by Carroll Young.

The film centres on Jungle Jim venturing into tribal land with pilot Ronald Cameron in search of Professor Dunham, who in turn is tracking down a rumoured creature known as the Okongo. Along the journey, Jim faces other obstacles, both man and wild. The film was theatrically released in the United States in February 1951.

Plot
Adventurer Jungle Jim (Johnny Weissmuller) is traversing the jungles of the Congo when he notices a plane diving towards the river. The agile explorer rescues the injured pilot, Ronald Cameron (William Henry), from the deep waters. Cameron tells Jim that he is trying to find missing biochemistry professor Dunham, under the University of Cairo's request. Dunham was last seen venturing into the jungles in search of a beast known as the Okongo.

The Okongo, half-antelope and half-zebra, is greatly revered by the tribal natives of Congo and its glands are rumoured to contain a rare type of drug. Jungle Jim and Cameron later discover from a tribal chief, Leta (Sherry Moreland), that Dunham and all the males of the Okongo tribe have been kidnapped by hunters who wish to extract the drug from the Okongo's glands. Jim, Leta, and Cameron make their way to the hunters' hideout. Halting their sinister plans, Leta lets loose the captured Okongo. It proceeds to kill one of the hunters. A fight ensues and during the scuffle, Professor Dunham smashes all the bottles of extracted Okongo drug.

The trio of Jungle Jim, Leta, and Cameron flee. They encounter a sandstorm and Jim engages in a battle with a gigantic desert spider, before returning to save Dunham's life. The professor, having been shot by one of the hunters, is left in Cameron and Leta's care. Dunham shockingly recognises Cameron as the leader of the notorious hunters. Too late, they all get captured by Cameron and his henchmen. Jim is commanded to bring the hunters to the main herd of Okongos. Just as they arrive, however, the hunters are attacked by both the armed wives of the male natives and the Okongos. Cameron manages to escape but falls from a cliff and dies. Leta and the natives savour their victory, and Jungle Jim and Dunham make their leave.

Production
While still a work-in-progress, the film's working title was Jungle Menace. Johnny Weissmuller was returned as Jungle Jim for the sixth time. The film featured Tamba, a chimpanzee actor, as Jungle Jim's pet. The film was directed by William Berke with assistance from Wilbur McGaugh. Sam Katzman was in charge of production for Columbia Pictures, while Carroll Young wrote the screenplay. Ira Morgan signed on as cinematographer. The set decorator was Sidney Clifford. Mischa Bakaleinikoff headed the musical direction, and Richard Fantl edited the film. Filming took place in late-June 1950. Filming locations included Vasquez Rocks and Corriganville.

Cast
Johnny Weissmuller	... 	Jungle Jim
 Sherry Moreland	... 	Leta
William Henry ... 	Ronald Cameron
Lyle Talbot ... Grant
 Joel Friedkin  ... Prof. Dunham
George Eldredge ... Barnes
Rusty Wescoatt ... 	Magruder
Paul Marion ... Raadi
John Hart ... 	Guard 
Pierce Lyden ... 	Allen 
Blanca Vischer ...  Mahara

Release and reception
The film was officially released in North American cinemas in February 1951. The Hollywood Reporter wrote in its commentary of the film that "Fury of the Congo packs enough excitement and color to please the juvenile and action fans." Variety commented that it was "mediocre filler fare at best", while the Motion Picture Herald described it as "largely juvenile in appeal".

See also
 List of Columbia Pictures films
 List of film series with more than ten entries

References

Bibliography

External links
 
 
 

1951 films
1950s action adventure films
Films directed by William A. Berke
Films set in Belgian Congo
Films set in the Democratic Republic of the Congo
Films set in the Republic of the Congo
American action adventure films
Columbia Pictures films
Jungle Jim films
American black-and-white films
1950s English-language films
1950s American films